Abdur Rouf (আবদুর রউফ) is a Bangladesh Awami League politician and the incumbent Member of Parliament from Kushtia-4.

Early life
Rouf was born on 12 November 1954. He has a M.A. degree.

Career
Rouf was elected to Parliament on 5 January 2014 from Kushtia-4 as a Bangladesh Awami League candidate. On 4 July 2015, he prevented Brazilian wheat from entering the Kumarkhali Upazila Food department warehouse. The wheat had been imported by the government of Bangladesh for its social safety net program. According to Rouf, the wheat was substandard and had not been tested.

References

Awami League politicians
Living people
1954 births
10th Jatiya Sangsad members